Digital Creations may refer to:

A company based in Folsom, California that developed software for the Amiga, including Brilliance
A company based in Fredericksburg, Virginia that developed Zope